The 2015–16 FC St. Pauli season is the club's 105th season of existence, and their fifth consecutive season in the 2. Bundesliga, the second tier of German football.

Background
After narrowly avoiding relegation during the 2014–15 season, FC. St Pauli started to strengthen the squad in the summer to prevent another relegation battle.

Transfers

In

Out

Competitions

Preseason

2. Bundesliga

Table

Match results

DFB-Pokal

Statistics

Squad and statistics
<

|}

References

FC St. Pauli seasons
Football Club Saint Pauli